Audrey Ann Wells (née Lederer; January 25, 1960 – October 4, 2018) was an American screenwriter, film director, and producer. Her 1999 film Guinevere won the Waldo Salt Screenwriting Award.

Early life
Wells was born in San Francisco, California, to Austrian-American psychiatrist Wolfgang Lederer and Romanian-American psychologist Alexandra Botwin Lederer; her parents fled World War II-era Europe. She had Ashkenazi and Sephardic Jewish ancestry.

Career
Wells worked as a disc jockey at San Francisco jazz radio station KJAZ FM. She graduated from U.C. Berkeley and UCLA.

She wrote a number of successful screenplays and directed three for which she had created the script. Her works were primarily comedies and romance films. Among her films are The Truth About Cats & Dogs (1996) and Under the Tuscan Sun (2003), both of which she also produced. Her 1999 film Guinevere won the Waldo Salt Screenwriting Award at the Sundance Film Festival. Wells also co-wrote the script for the comedy The Game Plan.

Death
Wells died of cancer on October 4, 2018. The film The Hate U Give, for which she wrote the screenplay, was released the next day. She is survived by her husband and daughter.

She also wrote the screenplay for the 2020 Netflix/Pearl Studio animated feature Over the Moon, which was dedicated to her memory.

Filmography
 The Truth About Cats & Dogs (1996), writer/executive producer
 George of the Jungle (1997), co-screenwriter
 Guinevere (1999), writer/director (feature directorial debut)
 Disney's The Kid (2000), writer
 Under the Tuscan Sun (2003), screen story writer/screenwriter/director/producer
 Shall We Dance? (2004), screenwriter
 The Game Plan (2007), co-story writer
 The Fugees (2012), director
 A Dog's Purpose (2017), co-screenwriter
 The Hate U Give (2018), screenwriter (film released posthumously)
 Abominable (2019), Additional screenplay material with Irena Brigull and William Davies (film released posthumously)
 Over the Moon (2020), writer (film released posthumously) - The film was dedicated to her memory.

See also
 List of female film and television directors

References

External links

Biography of uk.movies.yahoo.com

1960 births
2018 deaths
American people of Austrian-Jewish descent
American people of Romanian-Jewish descent
Film producers from California
American women film directors
American women screenwriters
Screenwriters from California
Writers from San Francisco
UCLA Film School alumni
University of California, Berkeley alumni
University of California, Los Angeles alumni
20th-century American women writers
21st-century American women writers
Deaths from cancer in California
Film directors from San Francisco
American women film producers